Kristijan Brčić (born 17 July 1987 in Zagreb) is a Croatian footballer who last played for Jarun Zagreb.

Club career 
On 3 February 2009, Portuguese club Nacional signed Brčić on loan from Inter Zaprešić. He later had a spell in Austria with SV Güssing.

References

External links 
Kristijan Brčić profile
Maksimir Profile

1987 births
Living people
Footballers from Zagreb
Association football midfielders
Croatian footballers
Croatia youth international footballers
NK Lučko players
NK Inter Zaprešić players
NK Maksimir players
C.D. Nacional players
NK Rudeš players
NK Zagorec Krapina players
Croatian Football League players
Austrian Landesliga players
Second Football League (Croatia) players
Croatian expatriate footballers
Expatriate footballers in Portugal
Croatian expatriate sportspeople in Portugal
Expatriate footballers in Austria
Croatian expatriate sportspeople in Austria